Penicillium allii is an anamorph fungus species of the genus of Penicillium. Penicillium allii is a pathogen of garlic (Allium sativum).

Further reading
Penicillium allii, a New Species from Egyptian Garlic Michael A. Vincent and John I. Pitt Mycologia Vol. 81, No. 2 (Mar. - Apr., 1989), pp. 300–303 Published by: Mycological Society of America

See also
List of Penicillium species

References

allii
Fungi described in 1989